Martin Patton (October 21, 1970 – November 20, 2012) was a running back in the Canadian Football League.

Originally playing with the powerhouse University of Miami Hurricanes, Patton ran into legal trouble. He received probation for credit card fraud and later had an altercation with police after a car accident (Patton lost most of his family in automotive accidents). His promising opportunity ended when he was dropped by the Hurricanes and he finished his college at Texas A&I. He led the Javelinas in rushing yards, with 876, in 1992 and was a Lone Star Conference all-star.

He played professional football with the CFL expansion Shreveport Pirates in 1994, leading the team with 659 rushing yards and 8 touchdowns. In 1995, he rushed for over 1,000 yards (1040) and was 3rd best rusher in the league. He finished his career in 1996 with the Winnipeg Blue Bombers.

Finally, Patton is in the CFL record books, tied with Earl Lunsford for having scored 5 rushing touchdowns in one game, against Winnipeg on August 5, 1995.

Patton died in a car accident on November 20, 2012, in Shelby County, Texas. He is survived by his four children Ashley McDonald, Taylor Patton, Kaila Patton, and Martin Patton Jr.

References

1970 births
2012 deaths
Shreveport Pirates players
Winnipeg Blue Bombers players
Canadian football running backs
Miami Hurricanes football players
Texas A&M–Kingsville Javelinas football players
African-American players of Canadian football
Road incident deaths in Texas
20th-century African-American sportspeople
21st-century African-American sportspeople
Players of Canadian football from Texas